Adrián Sánchez (born June 20, 1996), known as Eydren con el Ritmo or simply Eydren, is a music producer, songwriter and DJ who has worked in the urban genre, collaborating with artists such as Rauw Alejandro, Piso 21, Deorro, Irama, Sunmi, among many others.

He has been jointly nominated for Grammy Awards and other ceremonies as producer of Rauw Alejandro's album Afrodisíaco.

Musical career 
At the age of 15, he approached production more strongly, forming Dual Color, a DJ duo focused mainly on the EDM movement in which Eydren was able to show songs such as "Make it Bounce", which came to be placed in festivals such as the Ultra Music Fest and the EDC.

In 2019, the young producer's first steps in urban music took place, working in the Venezuelan music industry, but his career took a sharp turn when he received a direct message on Instagram from Rauw Alejandro, to whom he had sent -as to Lots of other artists- different musical works trying to be heard. It was from this conversation that "Mis Días Sin ti" was born, a single that would be published at the end of the year and which would result in the internationalization of the man from Caracas under the nickname Eydren Con El Ritmo or Eydren.

During 2020, he continued to work with Rauw Alejandro, specifically the songs "Enchule" and "Dile a Él" from the Afrodisíaco project, the Puerto Rican singer's first studio album, released on November 13 of that year, which would later be nominated for the 2022 Grammy Awards in the category Best Urban Album. While this was happening, Eydren decided to leave his native country to reside in Miami, United States, seeking to give more exposure to his sound.

At the end of 2021, Eydren managed to make the leap in his career by sealing his first contract with Universal Music Group. After closing this link, the young producer worked on "Al Lau" by Lele Pons, "Cosa Guapa" by Rauw Alejandro, "Mató Mi Corazón" by Piso 21, among others.

For February 2022, the release of "Museo" takes place, a single from Rauw Alejandro's EP Trap Cake, Vol. 2, produced by Eydren. Then, in July, he participated in "PAMPAMPAMPAMPAMPAM" by Italian Irama and "Number 1" by Mexican-American DJ Deorro.

Production credits

Awards and nominations

Grammy Awards

American Music Awards

Premios Tu Música Urbano

Other recognitions 
 2020: Lo Más Escuchado Awards - Best Latin Album | Afrodisíaco - Rauw Alejandro
 2021: Lo Más Escuchado Awards - Best Latin Album | Vice Versa - Rauw Alejandro
 2021: Master FM Awards - Best Latin Album of the Year | Vice Versa - Rauw Alejandro
 RIAA 6× Platinum album (Afrodisíaco - Rauw Alejandro)
 RIAA 7× Platinum album (Vice Versa - Rauw Alejandro)

References 

1996 births
Living people
People from Caracas
Venezuelan composers
Male composers
Universal Music Latino artists